Isopogon spathulatus is a species of flowering plant in the family Proteaceae and is endemic to south-western Western Australia. It is a shrub with linear to egg-shaped leaves with the narrower end towards the base, and more or less spherical heads of hairy pink flowers.

Description
The flowers are arranged on the ends of branchlets in sessile, spherical heads  in diameter with hairy, egg-shaped involucral bracts at the base.

Taxonomy
The species was first formally described in 1830 by Robert Brown in the Supplementum to his Prodromus Florae Novae Hollandiae et Insulae Van Diemen, based on material collected by William Baxter at King George's Sound.

In 1870, George Bentham reduced I. spathulatus to a variety of Isopogon buxifolius in Flora of Australia, but in 2015, Hislop and Rye reinstated I. spathulatus in the journal Nuytsia.

The specific epithet (spathulatus) means "spoon-shaped".

Distribution and habitat
This isopogon grows in heath or shrubland in swampy or winter-wet areas between Ruabon, Collie and the Stirling Range in the south-west of Western Australia.

Conservation statusIsopogon spathulatus'' is classified as "not threatened" by the Western Australian Government Department of Parks and Wildlife.

References

spathulatus
Endemic flora of Western Australia
Eudicots of Western Australia
Plants described in 1830
Taxa named by Robert Brown (botanist, born 1773)